John Campbell at Maybeck: Maybeck Recital Hall Series Volume 29 is an album of solo performances by jazz pianist John Campbell.

Music and recording
The album was recorded at the Maybeck Recital Hall in Berkeley, California in May 1993. The eight tracks are performances of standards.

Release and reception

The Penguin Guide to Jazz commented on Campbell's "tough but sophisticated bop playing". The AllMusic reviewer suggested that the pianist overused key changes.

Track listing
"Just Friends"
"Invitation"
"Emily"
"Darn That Dream"
"You and the Night and the Music"
"Easy to Love"
"I Wish I Knew"
"The Touch of Your Lips"

Personnel
John Campbell – piano

References

Albums recorded at the Maybeck Recital Hall
Solo piano jazz albums